The 2018 Copa Libertadores final stages were played from 7 August to 9 December 2018. A total of 16 teams competed in the final stages to decide the champions of the 2018 Copa Libertadores.

Qualified teams
The winners and runners-up of each of the eight groups in the group stage advanced to the round of 16.

Seeding

Starting from the round of 16, the teams were seeded according to their results in the group stage, with the group winners (Pot 1 in round of 16 draw) seeded 1–8, and the group runners-up (Pot 2 in round of 16 draw) seeded 9–16.

Format

Starting from the round of 16, the teams played a single-elimination tournament with the following rules:
Each tie was played on a home-and-away two-legged basis, with the higher-seeded team hosting the second leg (Regulations Article 23).
In the round of 16, quarterfinals, and semifinals, if tied on aggregate, the away goals rule was used. If still tied, extra time was not played, and a penalty shoot-out was used to determine the winner (Regulations Article 29).
In the finals, if tied on aggregate, the away goals rule was not used, and 30 minutes of extra time were played. If still tied after extra time, a penalty shoot-out was used to determine the winner (Regulations Article 30).

Draw

The draw for the round of 16 was held on 4 June 2018, 20:00 PYT (UTC−4), at the CONMEBOL Convention Centre in Luque, Paraguay. For the round of 16, the 16 teams were drawn into eight ties (A–H) between a group winner (Pot 1) and a group runner-up (Pot 2), with the group winners hosting the second leg. Teams from the same association or the same group could be drawn into the same tie.

Bracket
The bracket starting from the round of 16 was determined as follows:

The bracket was decided based on the round of 16 draw, which was held on 4 June 2018.

Round of 16
The first legs were played on 7–9 and 21 August, and the second legs were played on 28–30 August 2018.

|}

Notes

Match A

River Plate won 3–0 on aggregate and advanced to the quarterfinals (Match S1).

Match B

Tied 2–2 on aggregate, Colo-Colo won on away goals and advanced to the quarterfinals (Match S2).

Match C

Cruzeiro won 2–1 on aggregate and advanced to the quarterfinals (Match S3).

Match D

Tied 3–3 on aggregate, Grêmio won on penalties and advanced to the quarterfinals (Match S4).

Match E

Atlético Tucumán won 2–1 on aggregate and advanced to the quarterfinals (Match S4).

Match F

Boca Juniors won 6–2 on aggregate and advanced to the quarterfinals (Match S3).

Match G

Palmeiras won 2–1 on aggregate and advanced to the quarterfinals (Match S2).

Match H

Independiente won 3–0 on aggregate and advanced to the quarterfinals (Match S1).

Quarter-finals
The first legs were played on 18–20 September, and the second legs were played on 2–4 October 2018.

|}

Match S1

River Plate won 3–1 on aggregate and advanced to the semifinals (Match F1).

Match S2

Palmeiras won 4–0 on aggregate and advanced to the semifinals (Match F2).

Match S3

Boca Juniors won 3–1 on aggregate and advanced to the semifinals (Match F2).

Match S4

Grêmio won 6–0 on aggregate and advanced to the semifinals (Match F1).

Semi-finals
The first legs were played on 23–24 October, and the second legs were played on 30–31 October 2018.

|}

Match F1

Tied 2–2 on aggregate, River Plate won on away goals and advanced to the finals.

Match F2

Boca Juniors won 4–2 on aggregate and advanced to the finals.

Finals

In the finals, if tied on aggregate, the away goals rule was not used, and 30 minutes of extra time were played. If still tied after extra time, a penalty shoot-out was used to determine the winner (Regulations Article 30).

The first leg was played on 11 November (originally scheduled on 10 November, but postponed due to rain), and the second leg was played on 9 December 2018 (originally scheduled on 24 November, but postponed due to safety concerns following an attack on the Boca Juniors team bus prior to the original scheduled match).

River Plate won 5–3 on aggregate.

Notes

References

External links
CONMEBOL Libertadores 2018, CONMEBOL.com

3
August 2018 sports events in South America
September 2018 sports events in South America
October 2018 sports events in South America
November 2018 sports events in South America
December 2018 sports events in South America